Lorenzo Santiago "Chago" Alvarado Santos (1920–1982) was a Puerto Rican singer, composer, and guitarist. He became internationally famous with Johnny Albino and Félix ("Ola") Martínez as part of the Trío San Juan during the years 1949–1957. Among his best tunes was the 1956 bolero named "Siete notas de amor".

Early years
Alvarado was born in Ponce, Puerto Rico, on October 26, 1920. He was the son of the musician Julio Alvarado Tricoche (1886–1970) and Georgina Santos. He had six siblings. He was started into the world of music via his own mother, with whom he sing in public as a duet. In 1939 he was part of the "Tribuna del arte", a WNEL radio program. Winning the first award in that program marked the beginning of his career.  This took him to New York City after getting a contract with Chico Club of Greenwich Village.

Music career
In NYC he joined Celso Vega's quintet, obtaining exposure in the CBS and NBC radio networks. In 1944 he joined the Flores Sextet, led by composer Pedro Flores. He went on his first international tour with this group in 1946.  After the breakup of the group, he returned to Puerto Rico and was contracted by WEMB (Radio El Mundo), in 1947.

He returned to NYC and joined Cuarteto Yalí, headed by Félix Rodríguez «Corozo», in 1948. He joined Trío San Juan, marking the beginning of a new stage in his musical career. Many music experts judged this group to be the best Puerto Rican trio. Trío San Juan was highly regarded in México and Colombia, even better than Trío los Panchos.  It was also highly regarded in Venezuela, Brazil, Perú and Argentina, in addition to the United States.

The group enjoyed many hits, but none more successful than "Siete notas de amor", which has made the soundtrack of the Mexican movies including "El amor que yo te di" and "La cigüeña dijo sí" (1958), plus "¡Viva Jalisco, que es mi tierra!" (1959).  It also enjoyed French, Japanese, Italiano, and English versions.

Personal life
In July 1941, Chago married Aurora Torres in Ponce, Puerto Rico.  At that time, his legal name was Santiago Rodriguez. In subsequent years, Chago and his wife succeeded in obtaining the legal right to use the surname Alvarado. Aurora died in New York City in December 2011.  Chago and Aurora had five sons; one, Harry, died of heart disease in August 2015. He also had another wife named Pilar where they had a child; Lourdes. The song "Cosas como tu" is dedicated to Lourdes who is still alive.

Later years
Chago Alvarado lived his last years in Humacao, where he owned a restaurant and night club called "La Brasa Steak House". He performed there live on the weekends. Falling a victim of a renal illness, he died on July 23, 1982, at the age of 62.  He had married Irma Gloria Cedeño in 1977 and they had seven children.

See also

 List of Puerto Ricans

Notes

References

1920 births
1982 deaths
Singers from Ponce
20th-century Puerto Rican male singers